Rich Curtner is the former Federal Public Defender for the District of Alaska.

Education 

F. Richard Curtner received his undergraduate degree from Ohio State University in 1970. After serving in the U.S. Army from 1970 to 1972, he enrolled in the Capital University Law School in Columbus, Ohio, where he received his Juris Doctor degree in 1976.

Legal career 

Curtner started in the Public Defender Office in Columbus, Ohio, while in law school. After ten years, he was an office supervisor and felony trial attorney, handling a number of cases through trial and appeals. Curtner moved to Alaska in 1987. He spent the first five years in Alaska at the Public Defender Agency in Palmer. He first joined the Federal Defender Office in 1992 as an Assistant Federal Defender. Struggling in his career, Curtner returned briefly to private practice, and then he served a short term back at the State Public Defender Office as Training Director.

Federal public defender for Alaska 

In 1996, Curtner was appointed by the Ninth Circuit Court of Appeals as the Federal Defender for Alaska. Curtner was reappointed to five additional four-year terms. In 2018, Curtner announced his retirement, effective December 31, 2019. As the chief administrative officer, Rich Curtner works with five other Federal Defenders in the Anchorage home office, plus support staff. The office is responsible for providing indigent defense services in federal court for all of Alaska.

Curtner has represented clients including Joshua Wade, who in 2010 admitted to killing his neighbor, Mindy Schloss in 2007, as well as Della Brown in 2000, a crime for which Wade had been found not guilty at a state court trial. Curtner also represented confessed Serial killer Israel Keyes, who committed suicide while in custody awaiting trial for the horrific kidnapping and depraved murder of an 18-year-old Anchorage barista, Samantha Koenig.

Other activities 
Curtner has long served as a member of the Board of Directors of Alaskans Against the Death Penalty ("AADP"), and he is a strong supporter of the Alaska Innocence Project.
Curtner, a long time handball enthusiast, is Chairman of the Alaska Chapter of the United States Handball Association. He is also a member of the Board of Directors of the Anchorage International Film Festival

External links 
 Federal Public Defender for Alaska website

References

Living people
Lawyers from Anchorage, Alaska
Capital University Law School alumni
Ohio State University alumni
Public defenders
Alaska lawyers
Year of birth missing (living people)